Major histocompatibility complex, class II, DQ beta 1, also known as HLA-DQB1, is a human gene and also denotes the genetic locus that contains this gene. The protein encoded by this gene is one of two proteins that are required to form the DQ heterodimer, a cell surface receptor essential to the function of the immune system.

Function 
HLA-DQB1 belongs to the HLA class II beta chain paralogues. This class II molecule is a heterodimer consisting of an alpha (DQA) and a beta chain (DQB), both anchored in the membrane. It plays a central role in the immune system by presenting peptides derived from extracellular proteins. Class II molecules are expressed in antigen-presenting cells (APC: B lymphocytes, dendritic cells, macrophages).

Gene structure and polymorphisms
The beta chain is approximately 26-28 kDa and it contains 6 exons. Exon one encodes the leader peptide, exons 2 and 3 encode the two extracellular protein domains, exon 4 encodes the transmembrane domain, and exon 5 encodes the cytoplasmic tail. Within the DQ molecule, both the alpha chain and the beta chain contain the polymorphisms specifying the peptide binding specificities, resulting in up to 4 different molecules. Typing for these polymorphisms is routinely done for bone marrow transplantation.

Disease association

Diabetes
Several alleles of HLA-DQB1 are associated with an increased risk of developing type 1 diabetes.  The locus also has the genetic name IDDM1 as it is the highest genetic risk for type 1 diabetes. Again the DQB1*0201 and DQB1*0302 alleles, particularly the phenotype DQB1*0201/*0302 has a high risk of late onset type 1 diabetes. The risk is partially shared with the HLA-DR locus (DR3 and DR4 serotypes).

Celiac disease
Celiac1 is a genetic name for DQB1, the HLA DQB1*0201, *0202, and *0302 encode genes that mediate the autoimmune coeliac disease. Homozygotes of DQB1*0201 have a higher risk of developing the celiac disease, relative to any other genetic locus.

Multiple sclerosis
Certain HLA-DQB1 alleles are also linked to a modest increased risk of multiple sclerosis.

Narcolepsy
Other HLA-DQB1 alleles are associated with a predisposition to narcolepsy, specifically HLA-DQB1*0602, which is carried by over 90% of patients with narcolepsy-cataplexy.

Alleles

See also 
 Major histocompatibility complex
 Human leukocyte antigen
 HLA-DQ

References

External links 
 

MHC class II